Savnas is one of the biggest villages in Khed Taluka at the bank of the Jagbudi River.

Culture and religion
The majority of the population of Savnas is of the Islamic faith with sizable numbers of Buddhists located in the area of Buddha Wadi and also Hindus. Surve is the surname of a majority of the inhabitants. Savnas has a primary school till Grade 7 and had a high school till grade 10 which is now shut due to fewer students enrolling. For further studies, most students enrol in a college in karji or in khed. A major chunk of the economy depends on remittances from the Gulf countries sent by a semi skilled and skilled workforce. Agriculture, animal husbandry and fishing though formed the backbone of the local economy till the 70's, it is now neglected as the young workforce is lured by the lucrative salaries offered by the gulf countries. Sanvnas has its shares of doctors, engineers and lawyers who though have stayed away for a long time do visit occasionally thus maintaining a link with their roots. Traditional attire includes shirt and lungs for men and saree an Salwar suit for women. Though the village boasts different religious communities, there has never been any untoward incident amongst them with everyone getting along humanely. There are 4 Masjids namely Jaama, Minara, Baugh morally and Aameena Masjid serving the Muslim population. There is also a Dargah built on a hilltop which organises the annual Urs though devotees visiting is declining due to more people being guided onto the path of As Salaf As Salih. There is also a Buddhist and a Hindu temple.

Transportation
The village is well connected by road with distance of 24 km from the nearest KHED town. There are about six MSRTC buses which daily run between Savnas village & Khed town. Daily there are three MSRTC (Maharashtra State Road Transport Corporation) buses commuting between Mumbai & Thane cities from Savnas village.

Geographical location
The village of Savnas is blessed with plains, mountains and a river.

See also
 Ashti, Khed
 Bahirwali
 Bhoste
 Karji
 Kondivali
 Shirshi

References

Villages in Ratnagiri district